Mount Fearon is a mountain,  high, rising at the east side of Woodberry Glacier,  northwest of Mount Priestley, in the Prince Albert Mountains of Victoria Land, Antarctica. It was mapped by the United States Geological Survey from surveys and U.S. Navy air photos, 1956–62, and was named by the Advisory Committee on Antarctic Names for Colin E. Fearon, a biologist at McMurdo Station, summer 1962–63.

References 

Mountains of Victoria Land
Scott Coast